Ailes House may refer to:

Ailes House (Crystal Springs, Mississippi), listed on the NRHP in Mississippi
William Ailes House, Natchez, Mississippi, listed on the NRHP in Mississippi